The 2004–05 WHL season was the 39th season for the Western Hockey League. Twenty teams completed a 72-game schedule.  The Kelowna Rockets won the President's Cup.

Regular season

Final standings

Eastern Conference

Western Conference

Scoring leaders
Note: GP = Games played; G = Goals; A = Assists; Pts = Points; PIM = Penalties in minutes

Goaltending leaders
Note: GP = Games played; Min = Minutes played; W = Wins; L = Losses; T = Ties ; GA = Goals against; SO = Total shutouts; SV% = Save percentage; GAA = Goals against average

2005 WHL playoffs

Conference quarterfinals

Eastern Conference

Western Conference

Conference semifinals

Conference finals

WHL Championship

ADT Canada-Russia Challenge

On December 1, Team WHL defeated the Russian Selects 6–0 in Red Deer, Alberta before a crowd of 6,443.

On December 2, Team WHL defeated the Russian Selects 5–2 in Lethbridge, Alberta before a crowd of 5,152.

The WHL has an all-time record of 4–0 against the Russian Selects since the tournament began in 2003–04.

WHL awards

All-Star Teams

source: Western Hockey League press release

2005 Bantam Draft
The 2005 WHL Bantam Draft was the 16th annual draft into the WHL. It was held at the WHL head office in Calgary, on May 5, 2005.

List of first round picks in the bantam draft.

See also
2005 Memorial Cup
2005 NHL Entry Draft
2004 in sports
2005 in sports

References
whl.ca

WHL
WHL
Western Hockey League seasons